The Avayalik Islands are a group of islands located in the Northern Atlantic Ocean, within the Canadian province of Newfoundland and Labrador. They consist of two main islands, and at least seven smaller landmasses. It was first visited by archaeologists in 1967, when a team led by Patrick Plumet arrived for the first archaeological expedition.

History
The Avayalik islands were likely settled by the Middle Dorset people in the 5th to 7th centuries AD. Archaeological studies found several structures, including a winter house roughly 3–4 meters on each side, with a 3-4 meter long entrance tunnel, built during the same period.

References

External links 

New find bolsters case for Viking presence in Canadian Arctic

Islands of Newfoundland and Labrador